The Fox River (originally the Potikohua River) is a river in the Buller District of New Zealand. It arises in the Paparoa Range near Mount Dewar and flows north-west through the Paparoa National Park to the Tasman Sea at Woodpecker Bay. The river passes through a spectacular gorge. The northern branch of the river has limestone caves containing stalactite and stalagmite formations.

Toponymy 
The river was named after Bill Fox, a gold prospector. The Māori name Potikohua, comes from poti, a cooking basket, and kohua, steaming oven.

Description 
The Fox River has its origins high in the Paparoa Range, and flows in a north-west direction through the limestone syncline. The river passes through deep limestone canyons on its way to the coast. One of the main tributaries is Dilemma Creek.

The river valley is characterised by limestone escarpments, with steep sloping faces beneath. The forest type on these slopes is variable in height and composition. Common species include the nīkau palm (Rhopalostylis sapida), and tree ferns (especially mamaku (Sphaeropteris medullaris), pigeonwood (Hedycarya arborea), māhoe (Melicytus ramiflorus), kamahi (Weinmannia racemosa), and hīnau (Elaeocarpus dentatus), but nīkau and mamaku are often the most common. Above the steep slopes there are some large northern rata (Metrosideros robusta) and rimu (Dacrydium cupressinum), with occasional miro (Prumnopitys ferruginea). Rimu and miro are mainly present on the more gentle slopes, while northern rata is the only emergent tree on the steeper slopes below escarpments.

Tracks

Inland Pack Track

The full  length of the trail goes between the Punakaiki River in the south, and the mouth of the Fox River in the north. It takes two or three days to complete the track.

Fox River caves 
The Fox River caves, situated  up from the Fox River carpark, were an early tourist attraction in the area. The caves were receiving visitors in guided tours from around 1900. The caves have been well known for their stalactite formations.

Following the 2016 Kaikōura earthquake, the Department of Conservation closed the Fox River caves  because of the discovery of a large rockfall over the cave entrance.

Ballroom Overhang 

The Ballroom Overhang is a large limestone outcrop on the Fox River that provides a sheltered place for resting or overnight camping.

In suitable conditions, the  hike to the Ballroom Overhang and back can be made as return day trip from State Highway 6. This part of the route requires several river crossings and has been classified by the Department of Conservation as an advanced tramping track.

References

External links

 

Buller District
Rivers of the West Coast, New Zealand
Rivers of New Zealand
Paparoa National Park